Woodlawn railway station is a railway station situated on the Dublin-Galway line. It is beside a level crossing on the R359 regional road in the village of Woodlawn in County Galway, Ireland.

The station is on the Dublin to Galway Rail service. Passengers to or from Westport  travel to Athlone and change trains. Passengers to or from Limerick and Ennis travel to Athenry and change trains.

History
The station opened on 1 August 1858 and was closed for goods traffic on 2 June 1978.

Facilities
The station has an accessible waiting room and toilet. A ticket machine is located at the entrance to the platform. The car park is currently free of charge.

Additional trains from January 2013
The new Iarnród Éireann timetable introduced on 20 January 2013 sees three additional eastbound trains and one additional Galway-bound train serving the station.

Local requests for better service
On 26 April 2011, a protest numbering some two hundred local people took place at the station. The local action group is requesting that Iarnród Éireann improve the eastbound service from the station by allowing a morning Galway to Dublin train to serve the station.

See also
 List of railway stations in Ireland

References

External links
Irish Rail Woodlawn Station website

Iarnród Éireann stations in County Galway
Railway stations in County Galway
Railway stations opened in 1858